The UK Seniors Championship is a snooker tournament, part of the World Seniors Tour.

History
The event was created in 2017, as a part of the World Seniors Tour. The first UK Senior championship took place in October 2017, and was won by Jimmy White. The 2018 UK Seniors Championship took place at the Hull Venue, in Hull, England and was won by Ken Doherty who beat Igor Figueiredo in the final.

Winners

References

Recurring sporting events established in 2017
2017 establishments in England
Snooker non-ranking competitions
Snooker competitions in England
Senior sports competitions